Black Eagle is an unincorporated community in Wyoming County, West Virginia, United States. It was also known as Newlest.

References 

Unincorporated communities in Wyoming County, West Virginia
Coal towns in West Virginia